Andreas Vgenopoulos (10 December 1953 − 5 November 2016) was the chairman of Marfin Investment Group and was a major shareholder of Panathinaikos FC.  Vgenopoulos resigned from Panathinaikos in June 2010 citing differences with Giannis Vardinogiannis. His departure disappointed the fans of Panathinaikos. Vgenopoulos owned 1% of Marfin Popular Bank and 1,5% of the Marfin Investment Group. He had also been a Greek champion of Panathinaikos' Fencing department.

Education and business career
Vgenopoulos graduated from University of Athens with a degree in Law and from Long Island University (U.S.) with an MBA.

Vgenopoulos was a shareholder of Panathinaikos FC until June 2010, owning 20% of the club's shares. He was also a member of the board of directors of the club alongside Giannis Vardinogiannis and Pavlos Giannakopoulos. Panathinaikos is now owned by "Panathinaiki Symmahia" (Panthenaic Alliance) with Giannis Alafouzos as president.

Vgenopoulos was also the chairman of Olympic Air, the oldest Greek airline. Marfin Investment Group (MIG) bought the company from the Greek government on 1 October 2009. During the last three years, Mr. Vgenopoulos' MIG fund has seen the  wealth deteriorate, it is reported that it has lost 95% of its value.  Mr. Vgenopoulos is in the process of selling Olympic to Aegean.

References

External links
 grreporter.info
 paomprosta.gr

1953 births
2016 deaths
Sportspeople from Athens
Greek male fencers
Panathinaikos fencers
Panathinaikos A.O.
Olympic fencers of Greece
Fencers at the 1972 Summer Olympics
Greek football chairmen and investors
Greek businesspeople
Greek businesspeople in shipping
National and Kapodistrian University of Athens alumni